Aniceto "Chito" Mangahas Sobrepeña is the president of the Metrobank Foundation. He is also the executive director of GT Foundation, vice chairman of the Federal Land, vice chairman, Manila Doctors Hospital, Inc. and a member of the board of trustees of the Toyota Motor Philippines School of Technology, Inc.(TMP Tech).  Prior to working in the private sector, Sobrepeña was concurrently the cabinet secretary in the Office of the President and Head of the Presidential Management Staff during President Corazon C. Aquino’s administration, and deputy director general of the National Economic and Development Authority (NEDA).

Early life and education 

Sobrepeña was born on June 17, 1953, in San Jose City, a farming community in northern Nueva Ecija. He graduated with First Honorable Mention honors in high school in 1969. He finished his A.B. political science degree, cum laude, and with departmental honors at the Ateneo de Manila University (ADMU) in 1973. Later, he acquired his Certificate in Development Economics from the University of the Philippines School of Economics (UPSE) as a National Economic and Development Authority (NEDA) Scholar in 1974. He completed his Master of Arts in development economics from the Williams College in Massachusetts, US, in 1977, also a NEDA-USAID scholar in 1977.

Sobrepeña was a member of the  Federation of Free Farmers during the pre-martial law era, advocating land reform even though his family, owned substantial tracts of land in the province.  He was recruited to join the NEDA right after graduation, and after finishing his training at the UPSE, he volunteered for an assignment serving in the Eastern Visayas Regional Development Council from 1974 to 1976.

Public service 

Beginning as a Research Assistant, Sobrepeña became a director in the national government at the age of 27, steering the Policy Coordination Staff of NEDA. He later joined the Office of the President as undersecretary before being appointed as cabinet secretary and head of the Presidential Management Staff (PMS) from 1990 to 1992 during the historic transition to democrative governance, Sobrepeña was the youngest member in the Corazon Aquino Cabinet at 36. His last appointment in government was during the term of President Fidel V. Ramos as Deputy Director General of the NEDA from 1992 to 1995. his total government service of more than 22 years marked with the distinction of achieving the highest rank in the Career Executive Service Officers (CESO) corps (Rank I) from the Career Executive Service Board.

Sobrepeña worked for more than two decades in the public service. He directed and supervised the provision of technical and conference support to the president and the cabinet, through the Cabinet Assistance System (CAS), including coordination of presidential state visits. His responsibilities in the NEDA included managing the review of proposed economic policies and the formulation of regional and physical development plans. When President Aquino championed NGOs and people's organizations in governance and development, Chito served on the Philippine Council for Sustainable Development (PCSD).

Private sector 

Sobrepeña is currently the president of the Metrobank Foundation, Inc. (MBFI), the corporate social responsibility (CSR) arm of the Metrobank Group.

For more than 17 years now as a private sector leader, he has steered the MBFI to new heights of institutional achievements in the public affairs and human development arena. The MBFI has emerged as one of the country's most dynamic philanthropic organizations, implementing a wide array of CSR programs in such key sectors as education, visual arts, health care, the judiciary, police and military, and grant-making to various socio-civic and charitable institutions in the Philippines and in the Asia-Pacific Region.

Under Sobrepeña's leadership, Metrobank was declared winner in the Corporate Social Responsibility Program category of the 1999 Asian Banking Awards, in recognition of the significant impact of the MBFI's different programs on the country's development efforts.  Since joining the Metrobank Group, the MBFI has since garnered three (3) international awards and close to fifty (50) awards of recognition from public affairs organizations and government bodies, such as the Public Relations Society of the Philippines, and the International Association of Business Communicators Philippines.

In 2012 the Metrobank Foundation was awarded the Distinguished Sesquicentennial (150 years) Gawad Rizal Awards from the National Historical Commission of the Philippines. The institution was similarly recognized as Quezon City's Most Outstanding Organization for 2012 as the leading CSR institution for a leading banking enterprise.

In 2012, the United Nations Educational, Scientific and Cultural Organization (UNESCO) invited Sobrepeña to Paris, France to speak on the initiatives of Metrobank Foundation in promoting the status of teachers, especially the 28-year-old Search for Outstanding Teachers and the annual National Teachers’ Month celebrations. His being the lone panelist from Asia to address the international gathering was regarded as a recognition of the successful programs of the Foundation and the leadership of the institution in corporate social responsibility

The De La Salle University conferred on the Foundation the Signum Ministerii(Sign of Service) Medal “in recognition of its various initiatives, programs and achievements toward the enhancement of the quality of life of and the promotion of a culture of excellence among Filipinos.” MBFI is the third recipient of the award aligning itself with venerable institutions that have vigorously figured in the attainment of our nation's democracy, namely, the Radio Veritas, the only Catholic radio station in Asia in 1983, and the National Citizen's Movement for Free Elections (NAMFREL) in 1984.

Awards and recognition 

The following are some of the awards and recognition given to Sobrepeña in the course of his private and government career:

 Career Executive Service Officer, Rank  (the highest rank that the President of the Republic can appoint a civil servant; achieved through performance-based evaluation), 1991
 Katangi-tanging Huwaran ng Career Executive Service (CES Exemplars), Career Executive Service Board, 2008
 CEO (Communication Excellence in Organizations) Excel Award, International Association of Business Communicators Philippines, 2005
 Most Outstanding NEDA Official in the Central Office for CY 1993 (NEDA Director-General's Citation)
 Most Outstanding Citizen, San Jose City (Nueva Ecija), 20th Foundation Day Celebration, 1989
 Quezon City Most Outstanding Citizen for 2013, 74th Quezon City Founding Anniversary, 2013
 2013 Rotary Golden Wheel Awardee for Corporate Social Responsibility Development, Rotary Club District 3780

Personal life 

Sobrepeña is active in the “Ang Ligaya ng Panginoon” (Joy of the Lord), a Catholic Christian covenant community based in Metro Manila.  He has been a member since 1982, and was involved in the community and its Partners-in-Mission, including Couples for Christ, Christ's Youth in Action, and the Brotherhood of Christian Businessmen and Professionals. Chito had served as pastoral leader to single men and, together with his wife, and is currently involved in conducting marriage enrichment workshops, called Intimacy Weekend.

Chito is married to the former Anna Isabel Crisostomo and has three children who all have completed college education, namely: Gabriel, Rafael, and Michaela.

References

 “Aniceto ‘Chito’ Sobrepeña". Manila Bulletin http://www.mb.com.ph/articles/378062/aniceto-chito-sobrepe-a (accessed on November 15, 2012)
 “Executive Profile: Aniceto M. Sobrepeña” Businessweek http://investing.businessweek.com/research/stocks/people/person.asp?personId=11502822&ticker=MBT:PM&previousCapId=874909&previousTitle=METROPOLITAN%20BANK%20%26%20TRUST (accessed on November 15, 2012)
 “Profile Display Aniceto Sobrepeña” www.jesuitcommons.org/index.asp?bid=74&smid=21105 (accessed on November 15, 2012)
 “Interview: Aniceto Sobrepeña, President, Metrobank Foundation-Philippines” United Nations Educational, Scientific and Cultural Organization (UNESCO) http://www.unesco.org/new/en/education/themes/education-building-blocks/teacher-education/single-view/news/interview_aniceto_sobrepena_president_metrobank_foundation_philippines/ (accessed on November 15, 2012)
 “Entrevista: Aniceto Sobrepeña, Presidente de la Fundación Metrobank-Filipinas”. Organización de las Naciones Unidas para la Educación, la Ciencia y la Cultura (UNESCO) http://www.unesco.org/new/es/media-services/single-view/news/interview_aniceto_sobrepena_president_metrobank_foundation_philippines/ (accessed on November 15, 2012)
 “Interview - Aniceto Sobrepeña, Président de la Fundation Metrobank, Philippines”. Organisation des Nations Unies pour l’ėducation, la science et la culture (UNESCO) http://www.unesco.org/new/fr/media-services/single-view/news/interview_aniceto_sobrepena_president_metrobank_foundation_philippines/ (accessed on November 15, 2012)
 “DLSU confers Signum Ministerii to Metrobank Foundation”. SunStar http://www.sunstar.com.ph/manila/business/2013/02/20/dlsu-confers-signum-ministerii-metrobank-foundation-269166 (accessed on November 15, 2012)
 “Trustee: Aniceto Sobrepeña”. PinoyMe Foundation https://web.archive.org/web/20130717005449/http://www.pinoyme.com/who-we-are/people (accessed on November 15, 2012)
 “Sobrepena, Aniceto”. Reuters https://www.reuters.com/finance/stocks/officerProfile?symbol=MBT.PS&officerId=520665 (accessed on November 15, 2012)
 "Sobrepena, Aniceto". Manila Bulletin 
 "CESDP Alumni". Career Executive Service Development Program http://dap.edu.ph/pmdp/index.php?option=com_content&view=article&id=33&Itemid=46 (accessed on July 16, 2013)
 "Board of Trustees". Local Government Academy https://web.archive.org/web/20130801143250/http://lga.gov.ph/board-trustees (accessed on July 16, 2013)
 "Aniceto M. Sobrepena". YouTube https://www.youtube.com/watch?v=wU7h9PPrqDc (accessed on July 16, 2013)
 "Mr. Aniceto M. Sobrepena. President, Metrobank Foundation". UNESCO http://mbfoundation.org.ph/docs/AMS-UNSECO-Paris-Powerpoint.pdf (accessed on July 16, 2013)
 "Aniceto "Chito" Sobrepena". Yahoo! News Philippines https://web.archive.org/web/20131029194300/http://ph.news.yahoo.com/aniceto-chito-sobrepe-021944123--finance.html (accessed on July 18, 2013)
 "Opening Remarks of President Aniceto Sobrepena". Search for the Country's Outstanding Policemen in Service (COPS) Awarding Ceremonies https://web.archive.org/web/20140913083230/http://www.cops.ph/cops-search/cops-speeches/306-opening-remarks-of-president-aniceto-sobrepena (accessed July 18, 2013)
 "‘Made of Gold’: Lavish book celebrates nearly 30 years of Metrobank art contest". Philippine Daily Inquirer http://lifestyle.inquirer.net/97825/made-of-gold-lavish-book-celebrates-nearly-30-years-of-metrobank-art-contest (accessed on July 18, 2013)
 "Thirteen Artists Awards Ceremony and Exhibit Opening at the CCP". Cultural Center of the Philippines  (accessed on July 18, 2013)
 Chee Kee, Raoul J. "Chito Sobrepeña – Why giving back to society has been his life’s work" Philippine Daily Inquirer 18 Aug. 2013: Sunday Lifestyle. http://lifestyle.inquirer.net/120769/chito-sobrepena-why-giving-back-to-society-has-been-his-lifes-work#ixzz2cN5hq500 (accessed on August 20, 2013)
 Elmenzo, Marlene H. “The Power of Communication.” Newsbreak 13 Feb. 2006: 34. Print
 Icasiano, Aurelio “The Power of Empowerment” Metro Society Nov. 2012: Print
 Sobrepeña, Aniceto M. “A CESO Remembers: Serving Government with President Cory.” Public Manager (Official Magazine of the Career Executive Service) 2009: 13–14. Print
 Sobrepeña, Aniceto M. “In Great Company: CESDP Days of Remembrance.” Public Manager (Official Magazine of the Career Executive Service) Dec. 2008: 4–5. Print
 Sobrepeña, Aniceto M. “Response to an Excellent God” The Windhover (The Philippine Jesuit Magazine) 3rd Quarter 2004: 14–15. Print

Filipino business executives
Ateneo de Manila University alumni
People from Nueva Ecija
Cabinet Secretaries of the Philippines
Heads of the Presidential Management Staff of the Philippines
Corazon Aquino administration cabinet members
Living people
1953 births